Marshal of the Royal Air Force Sir Keith Alec Williamson,  (25 February 1928 – 2 May 2018) was a senior officer in the Royal Air Force. He served with the Royal Australian Air Force flying Meteors in a ground attack role during the Korean War. He was a squadron commander and then a station commander during the 1960s and a senior air commander in the 1980s. He was Chief of the Air Staff during the early 1980s at the time of the emergency airlift of food and supplies to Ethiopia ("Operation Bushel").

RAF career
The son of Percy Williamson and his wife Gertrude, Williamson was educated at Bancroft's School and Market Harborough Grammar School. He enlisted in the Aircraft Apprentice Scheme at RAF Halton in 1945, and was transferred to the Aircraft Apprentice Wing at RAF Cranwell, No 1 Radio School where he joined the 50th Entry and was trained as an Air Radio Fitter. After graduating in 1948, he was selected for a cadetship at RAF College Cranwell and was commissioned on 13 December 1950. He was sent to the Advanced Flying School at RAF Driffield, where he trained on Meteors and Vampires and was then posted to No. 112 Squadron in July 1951 flying Vampires initially from RAF Fassberg and then from RAF Jever in Germany.

Promoted to flying officer on 13 December 1951, Williamson volunteered to join No. 77 Squadron RAAF flying Meteors in a ground attack role in the Korean War in January 1953. After being promoted to flight lieutenant on 13 June 1953, he returned home in late 1953 to become aide-de-camp to Air Marshal Sir Harold Lydford, the Air Officer Commanding-in-Chief, RAF Home Command. After briefly returning to No. 112 Squadron in 1956, he joined No. 20 Squadron at RAF Oldenburg in Germany as a flight commander flying Hunters. Promoted to squadron leader on 1 July 1958, that year he went to the Central Flying School where he became a Qualified Flying Instructor and then an examiner.

Williamson attended the RAF Staff College in 1962 and was then post to the Air Secretary's department at the Air Ministry. He was promoted to wing commander on 1 January 1964. He was given command of No. 23 Squadron flying Lightnings from RAF Leuchars in 1966 and became Station Commander at RAF Gütersloh in 1968. He was awarded the Air Force Cross in the 1968 Birthday Honours, and promoted to group captain on 1 July 1968. After attending the Royal College of Defence Studies in 1971, he became Director of Air Staff Plans at the Ministry of Defence in 1972 and was promoted to air commodore on 1 January 1973. Promoted to air vice marshal on 1 July 1975, he was appointed Commandant of the RAF Staff College, Bracknell, on 16 August 1975.

Williamson went on to be Assistant Chief of Staff (Plans and Policy) at SHAPE on 10 March 1977 and then became Air Officer Commanding-in-Chief at Support Command with the acting rank of air marshal on 30 August 1978. He was promoted to the substantive rank of air marshal on 1 January 1979.

Williamson was made Commander-in-Chief Strike Command with the acting rank of air chief marshal on 15 September 1980. He was promoted to the substantive rank of air chief marshal on 1 March 1981 and advanced to Knight Grand Cross of the Order of the Bath in the 1982 Birthday Honours. He became Chief of the Air Staff on 15 October 1982 and was appointed Air Aide-de-Camp to the Queen on the same day. As Chief of the Air Staff he persuaded the British Government to build a completely new airfield at Mount Pleasant in the Falkland Islands in the aftermath of the Falklands War. He also implemented the emergency airlift of food and supplies to Ethiopia in the wake of severe drought, famine and civil war there ("Operation Bushel") and advised on the international agreement to proceed with the European Fighter programme. He was promoted to Marshal of the Royal Air Force on 15 October 1985 and retired the same month.

Later work
In retirement Williamson devoted much of his time to the Presidency of the Royal Air Forces Association. He was also Vice-President of SSAFA.

He died on 2 May 2018 at the age of 90.

Personal life
In 1953 he married Patricia Anne Watts; they had two sons and two daughters. His interests included golf.

References

Sources

|-

|-

|-

|-

1928 births
2018 deaths
Marshals of the Royal Air Force
Chiefs of the Air Staff (United Kingdom)
Knights Grand Cross of the Order of the Bath
Recipients of the Air Force Cross (United Kingdom)
Graduates of the Royal Air Force College Cranwell
Trenchard Brats
Graduates of the Royal College of Defence Studies
Military personnel from London